Hsinchu International School (HIS) is private, international school located in Xiangshan District, Hsinchu City, Taiwan offering education to foreign-born students. Founded in 1981 by the Dutch Electronics Company Philips as a company school for the expatriate families they employed, it later grew to serve other expatriate families. While the official name of the school is "Hsinchu Dutch International School", the Dutch language or curriculum have never been taught but the Chinese name reflects the history of the school.

In 1988 the school became an independent, licensed school through the Dutch Trade Office.  It is recognized by American Institute in Taiwan and the Ministry of Education, Taiwan.  It began as a K-7 grade school, but added a Secondary Department and now offers Pre-K through 12 grade education.  The Secondary Department (grades 7 to 12) received WASC candidacy in August 2008 and attained full accreditation in August 2011.

Campus 

In 2007, HIS moved to its present location: a newly constructed 5-storey campus adjacent to Xiangshan Municipal Elementary School.  The school contains an auditorium, music studios, weight room, cafeteria, science labs (for both Elementary and Secondary students), a dance studio, computer lab and a library.

See also 

National Experimental High School
Morrison Academy
Taiwan Adventist International School
The Primacy Collegiate Academy

References

External links 
Hsinchu International School

1981 establishments in Taiwan
Educational institutions established in 1981
International schools in Taiwan
Schools in Hsinchu